Harper Regan is a two-act play by Simon Stephens that premiered at the National Theatre in 2008.

Setting
Set in UK, Autumn of 2006 : from Uxbridge to Stockport to Manchester and back.

Synopsis
One woman's struggle with the difficulties of her personal and family life.

At forty one, Harper Regan suddenly leaves her family in the suburbs of West London and sets off on a mission to see her father before he dies. Her journey becomes a road trip through the heart of England in this violent and comic exploration of the moralities of sex and death. It explores Harper's relationship with her daughter, husband and mother.

Production history

UK
Premiered at the National Theatre in 2008. With Lesley Sharp as Harper Regan.

Israel

Premiered at the Gesher Theater in Tel Aviv in November 2009 under the direction of Oded Kotler, with Laura Rivlin in the principal role.

United States

Premiered at Steep Theatre in Chicago, Illinois in January 2010 under the direction of Robin Witt, with Kendra Thulin playing the title role. The New York premiere was presented Off-Broadway by the Atlantic Theater Company in October 2012 at the Linda Gross Theater. Directed by Gaye Taylor Upchurch, the cast included Mary McCann in the title role, Mary Beth Peil as Alison Woolley, John Sharian as Duncan Woolley, Peter Scanavino as Mickey Nestor, Christopher Innvar as James Fortune, Mahira Kakkar as Justine Ross, Jordan Lage as Elwood Barnes, Madeleine Martin as Sarah Regan, Gareth Sake as Seth Regan, and Stephen Tyrone Williams as Tobias Rich.

Canada

Premiere at Canada Stage in Toronto, Ontario in March 2015 under the direction of Matthew Jocelyn, with Molly Parker playing the title role.

Austria

Premiere at Off-Theater in Vienna in January 2017 under the direction of Markus Emil Felkel, with Pilar Aguilera playing the title role.

Notes

External links
 Harper Regan at The National Theatre
 House of Cards star Molly Parker returns to the stage

Plays by Simon Stephens
2008 plays